Straszów may refer to the following places:
Straszów, Łódź Voivodeship (central Poland)
Straszów, Lubusz Voivodeship (west Poland)
Straszów, Świętokrzyskie Voivodeship (south-central Poland)